Johnny 'Bump City' Bumphus (August 17, 1960 – January 31, 2020) was an American professional boxer who held the WBA super lightweight title in 1984 and challenged once for the WBC and IBF welterweight titles in 1987.

Amateur career
Bumphus began boxing as an amateur at the age of eight out of the Tacoma Boy's Club Boxing Club, located on 25th and Yakima Avenue. He was one of four World Champions to begin boxing in Tacoma, the others being Freddie Steele, Rocky Lockridge and Leo Randolph.

His amateur highlights were:
1977 National AAU Featherweight Champion, decisioning Lee Simmons of Akron, Ohio, in the final.
1979 National Golden Gloves Champion (132 lbs), defeating Efrain Nieves at Indianapolis

In 1979 he was ranked #1 U.S. Lightweight by the U.S. Amateur Boxers and Coaches Association, meanwhile, serving as a deputy sheriff with the Nashville Sheriff's Department in Nashville, Tennessee.

Bumphus had qualified for the 1980 American Olympic boxing team but did not compete due to the American boycott of the Moscow Olympics. Bumphus was the torch bearer for the American Olympians.

Soon afterwards in August 1980 he signed with boxing promoter Bob Arum reportedly for $500,000.

Highlights

National Golden Gloves (125 lbs), Honolulu, Hawaii, March–April 1977:
1/2: Defeated Larry Tatman by decision
Finals: Lost to Bernard Taylor by decision
 United States National Championships (125 lbs), Winston-Salem, North Carolina, May 1977:
1/2: Defeated Jerry Smith by decision
Finals: Defeated Leo Simmons by decision
USA–Poland Duals (125 lbs), Las Vegas, Nevada, August 1977:
Lost to Roman Gotfryd (Poland) by unanimous decision, 0–3
USA–Romania Duals (125 lbs), Caesars Tahoe, Stateline, Nevada, January 1978:
Defeated Gheorghe Ciochina (Romania) by decision
USA–Yugoslavia Duals (132 lbs), Memphis, Tennessee, February 1978:
Defeated Ace Rusevski (Yugoslavia) by decision
United States National Championships (132 lbs), Biloxi, Mississippi, April 1978:
1/8: Defeated Mike Hess by decision
1/4: Lost to Davey Armstrong by decision
USA–USSR Duals (132 lbs), Las Vegas, Nevada, January 1979:
Defeated Dmitriy Grubov (Soviet Union) by decision
Cuba–USA Duals (132 lbs), Havana, Cuba, February 1979:
Defeated Adolfo Horta (Cuba) by decision
 Southern Golden Gloves (132 lbs), Knoxville, Tennessee, March 1979:
Defeated Arnaldo Maura RSC 3 
 National Golden Gloves (132 lbs), Indianapolis, Indiana, March 1979:
1/2: Defeated Melvin Paul by decision
Finals: Defeated Efrain Nieves by decision
 National Sports Festival (139 lbs), July 1979:
 (no data available)
Pan Am Trials (132 lbs), Toledo, Ohio, May–June 1979:
1/2: Defeated Robert Hines by decision
Finals: Lost to Davey Armstrong by decision
USA–FRG Duals (139 lbs), Rapid City, South Dakota, August 1979:
Defeated Werner Schäfer (West Germany) by unanimous decision, 3–0

Nashville Sheriff's Dept. vs. Jackson Boxing Club (139 lbs), Clearview Shopping Center gym, Mount Juliet, Tennessee, January 1980:
Defeated Will Sommerville
Jackson Boxing Club vs. Nashville Sheriff's Dept. (139 lbs), Jackson Coliseum, Jackson, Tennessee, February 1980:
 (no data available)
 46th Midstate Golden Gloves Tournament (139 lbs), Franklin Optimist Center, Franklin, Tennessee, February 1980:
Defeated Freddie Bostic RSCH 2
USA–Cuba Duals (139 lbs), Charlotte Coliseum, Charlotte, North Carolina, February 1980:
Defeated Armando Martínez (Cuba) by decision
 Southern Golden Gloves (139 lbs), Knoxville, Tennessee, March 1980:
 (no data available)
GDR–USA Duals (139 lbs), Schwerin, East Germany, March 1980:
Defeated Karl-Heinz Krüger (East Germany) by unanimous decision, 3–0
GDR–USA Duals (139 lbs), Rostock, East Germany, March 1980:
Defeated Dietmar Schwarz (East Germany) by decision
USA–Scandinavia Duals (139 lbs), Biloxi, Mississippi, April 1980:
Defeated Fleming Pederson (Denmark) KO 2
Southern AAU Tournament (139 lbs), Franklin Optimist Center, Franklin, Tennessee, April 1980:
Defeated Walter Webster by medical walkover
 United States National Championships (139 lbs), Caesars Palace, Las Vegas, Nevada, May 1980:
1/2: Defeated Harry Arroyo by decision
Finals: Defeated Darryl Anthony by unanimous decision, 5–0 
Olympic Trials (139 lbs), Atlanta, Georgia, June 1980:
1/4: Defeated Darryl Anthony by unanimous decision, 5–0 
1/2: Defeated Terry Silver DQ 3 
Finals: Defeated Ronnie Shields by unanimous decision, 5–0 
 National Junior Olympics Multi-Sports Festival (139 lbs), Santa Clara University, Santa Clara, California, August 1980:
 (no data available)

Bumphus finished his amateur career at 341–16, (or 354–16.)

Olympics
Bumphus qualified at 139 pounds and was a member of the 1980 U.S. Olympic boxing team that died in the crash of LOT Polish Airlines Flight 007 in Warsaw, Poland, on March 14, 1980 en route to the USA vs. Poland Box-off as part of "USA vs. the World" event. Bumphus was not with the team. Among the USA Boxing teammates who were killed in the crash were Lemuel Steeples from St. Louis, Calvin Anderson from Connecticut, Paul Palomino - the brother of Carlos Palomino, George Pimental and the Olympic coach, Sarge Johnson. Members of the team who were also not aboard included Bobby Czyz, Alex Ramos and James Shuler.

Bumphus earned his place on the team with a win over Ronnie Shields. Bumphus did not compete in the Olympics, due to the  1980 Summer Olympics boycott. In 2007, he received one of 461 Congressional Gold Medals created especially for the spurned athletes.

His reaction to the LOT Polish Airlines Flight 7 crash, where several of his teammates were killed, was: "We were going in the same direction a week ahead on the same plane and everything, so I'm just grateful it wasn't me that went down in the crash."

Professional career
Dubbed "Bump City", Bumphus began his professional career as a hot prospect, winning his first 22 fights, including the vacant WBA Light Welterweight Title with a decision win over Lorenzo Luis Garcia in 1984. Bumphus lost the belt to Gene Hatcher in June 1984 in Buffalo, New York. Hatcher scored an 11th-round technical knockout that had Hatcher knocking Bumphus down, then slipping and falling on a follow-up attempt, then throwing Bumphus down to the mat when both fighters clinched. A post-fight melee in the ring then ensued, as Hatcher was celebrating in triumph while the now-deposed champion was slugging away in frustration. The fight was named as Ring magazine's Upset of the year for 1984. In 1987, Bumphus took on Lloyd Honeyghan for the WBC and IBF Welterweight Title, but lost with 2nd round technical knock out. He retired after the loss, with a  record of 29-2-0.

Those in Tacoma's Hilltop area knew of the lure drugs had for Bumphus. Towards the end of his boxing career he developed an addiction to cocaine, which he briefly kicked. When he returned to Tacoma, through a series of bad friends and choices, he resumed taking drugs in 1989, becoming addicted to crack cocaine. In 1995, he spent a year in rehab, and then left Tacoma to work as a trainer for his former manager Lou Duva in West Palm Beach, Florida.

As a trainer, he worked with Kassim Ouma and Emmett Linton.

Professional boxing record

References

External links
 

|-

1960 births
2020 deaths
Light-welterweight boxers
World boxing champions
Winners of the United States Championship for amateur boxers
Sportspeople from Tacoma, Washington
Boxers from Washington (state)
American male boxers
Congressional Gold Medal recipients
Southpaw boxers